Wendi Dianne Roe is a New Zealand veterinary pathologist who specialises in researching marine mammals. She is Professor of Veterinary and Marine Mammal Pathology and Deputy Head of the School of Veterinary Science at Massey University.

Academic career 
Roe completed a BSc at the University of Waikato in 1984. She moved to Massey University where she undertook a Bachelor of Veterinary Science (1990). Following graduation, she practised as a veterinarian for ten years in both New Zealand and England. She then studied veterinary pathology at Massey University and later graduated with a PhD titled A study of brain injury in New Zealand sea lion pups (2012). Roe was promoted to full professor at Massey, effective 1 January 2020.

Selected works

References

External links 

 Wendi Roe, Massey University alumni profile

Living people
Year of birth missing (living people)
University of Waikato alumni
Massey University alumni
Academic staff of the Massey University
New Zealand veterinarians
New Zealand women academics